Kobra is a Swedish television programme produced by SVT with interviews and reportage about culture, presented by Kristofer Lundström. It started in 2001. The programme is broadcast 10 p.m., Tuesday nights. The programme won the  Kristallen in 2005 and 2009 for best lifestyle/magazine programme and best culture and society programme respectively.

History
Kobra started in 2001 with Ingvar Storm as presenter. Since 2002 Kristofer Lundström is the presenter. The program is presenting about modern art expressions in Sweden and in the world to discuss social and political tendencies in present time.

In Kobra several well-known culture personalities have participated, such as Norman Mailer, Joyce Carol Oates, David Lynch, Takashi Murakami, Emir Kusturica, Viktor & Rolf, Madonna, M.I.A., Nick Cave, Jeff Koons, Katharine Hamnett, Ingmar Bergman, Nan Goldin, Michel Gondry, Rajiv Chandrasekaran, Philip Gourevitch, John le Carré, Susan Faludi, Chris Anderson, Isabelle Huppert, Woody Allen and Bruce Springsteen.

Seasons

Season 24

Season 25

Season 26

Season 27

Season 28

References 

2001 Swedish television series debuts
2005 Kristallen winners
2009 Kristallen winners
Sveriges Television original programming
Cultural depictions of Emir Kusturica
Cultural depictions of Madonna
Cultural depictions of Woody Allen